Robert Augustus Gregory (17 October 1888 – 9 November 1967) was an Australian rules footballer who played for the Melbourne Football Club in the Victorian Football League (VFL).

Family
The son of Robert Gregory, and Elizabeth Martha Gregory (-1929), née Phillips, Robert Augustus Gregory was born at Pyramid Hill on 17 October 1888.

He married Ina Marguerite Trotman in (1899-1977) in 1931.

Death
He died at the Pyramid Hill Bush Nursing Hospital on 9 November 1967.

Notes

References
 
 World War Two Nominal Roll: Private Robert Augustus Gregory (V402252), Department of Veterans' Affairs.

External links 

 
 Bert Gregory on Demonwiki

1888 births
1967 deaths
Australian rules footballers from Victoria (Australia)
Melbourne Football Club players
South Ballarat Football Club players